Koruk may refer to:

Koruk Chutur, a village in Kalaleh County, Iran
Kuruk, a village in Kalaleh County, Iran
Koruk, Bitlis, a village in Turkey

See also
Karuk (disambiguation)